The 53rd Golden Bell Awards was held on October 6, 2018, at the Sun Yat-sen Memorial Hall in Taipei, Taiwan. The ceremony was televised by Sanlih E-Television and Public Television Service. Mickey Huang and Patty Hou were the hosts for the night.

Winners and nominees
Below is the list of winners and nominees for the main categories.

References

External links
 Official website of the 53rd Golden Bell Awards

2018
2018 television awards
2018 in Taiwan